Shoʻrchi is a city in Surxondaryo Region, Uzbekistan. It is the administrative center of Shoʻrchi District. The town population was 16,560 people in 1989, and 25,000 in 2016.

References

Populated places in Surxondaryo Region
Cities in Uzbekistan